Spy of Madame Pompadour (German: Marquis d'Eon, der Spion der Pompadour) is a 1928 German silent film directed by Karl Grune and starring Liane Haid, Fritz Kortner and Alfred Gerasch. It portrays the life of the eighteenth century figure Marquis d'Eon.

It was made at the Emelka Studios in Munich by Bavaria Film. The film's sets were designed by the art directors Ludwig Reiber and Willy Reiber.

Cast
 Liane Haid as Marquis d'Eon  
 Fritz Kortner as Zar Paul von Rußland  
 Alfred Gerasch as Louis XV - König von Frankreich  
 Agnes Esterhazy as Madame Pompadour  
 Mona Maris as Die Zarin  
 Dene Morel as Lord Hatfield  
 Karl Graumann as Prinz Conti 
 Nikolai Malikoff as Der russische Gesandte  
 Philipp Manning as Der Großfürst

References

Bibliography
 Klossner, Michael. The Europe of 1500-1815 on Film and Television: A Worldwide Filmography of Over 2550 Works, 1895 Through 2000. McFarland & Company, 2002.

External links

1928 films
German historical films
1920s historical films
Films set in France
Films set in the 18th century
Films of the Weimar Republic
Films directed by Karl Grune
German silent feature films
Cross-dressing in film
Bavaria Film films
Films shot at Bavaria Studios
German black-and-white films
Films scored by Leo Fall
1920s German films